Bennie Green with Art Farmer is an album by American trombonist Bennie Green with trumpeter Art Farmer. It was recorded in 1956 and released on the Prestige label.

Reception
The AllMusic review by Scott Yanow awarded the album 3 stars and stated: "The playing is not flawless on this recording but the soloists take chances and the music is often exciting. It's recommended to straightahead jazz fans."

Track listing
All compositions by Bennie Green except where noted.
 "My Blue Heaven" (Walter Donaldson, George A. Whiting) – 5:26
 "Sky Coach" (Art Farmer) – 5:31
 "Cliff Dweller" (Cliff Smalls) – 5:50
 "Let's Stretch" – 10:52
 "Gone With the Wind" (Herb Magidson, Allie Wrubel) – 6:24

Personnel
Bennie Green – trombone
Art Farmer – trumpet
Cliff Smalls – piano
Addison Farmer – bass
Philly Joe Jones – drums

References 

Prestige Records albums
Bennie Green albums
Art Farmer albums
1956 albums
Albums recorded at Van Gelder Studio